Jurčić is a Croatian surname. Notable people with the surname include:

 Andrea Jurčić (born 1972), Croatian badminton and volleyball player
 Krunoslav Jurčić (born 1969), Croatian football player and manager
 Ljubo Jurčić (born 1954), Croatian economist and politician

See also
 Jurić
 Juričić

Croatian surnames